Sukch'ŏn County is a kun (county) in South P'yŏngan province, North Korea.

Administrative divisions
Sukch'ŏn county is divided into 1 ŭp (town), 1 rodongjagu (workers' districts) and 20 ri (villages):

Transportation
Sukch'ŏn county is served by the P'yŏngŭi, P'yŏngnam and Sŏhae lines of the Korean State Railway.

References

External links
  Map of Pyongan provinces
  Detailed map

Counties of South Pyongan